Niederried may refer to:

Niederried bei Kallnach, Switzerland
Niederried bei Interlaken, Switzerland